Elachista gruenewaldi is a moth of the family Elachistidae that is endemic to Italy.

References

gruenewaldi
Moths described in 2002
Endemic fauna of Italy
Moths of Europe